Hume Lake Christian Camps is a non-denominational, nonprofit parachurch organization and is one of the largest operators of Christian camps and conference centers in the world. Hume operates year-round camps and conference centers at multiple locations with programing for youth, family, and adults and has hosted more than 1 million visitors. Hume's camps focus on Bible teaching and worship services.

Hume Lake 
Hume Lake is located in the Sequoia National Forest 65 miles east of Fresno, California in the unincorporated community of Hume, California adjacent to Hume Lake. Hume Lake is primarily a summer camp for students but also hosts various conferences and retreats. The 365 acre camp includes four chapels, three dining halls and various accommodations and can host up to 3,000 people at one time and hosts more than 40,000 annually.  Hume Lake was built on the site of a 100 year old defunct logging town built by the Hume-Bennett Lumber Company and utilizes many of the original facilities.

Primary Ministries 
 Wagon Train is a camp for elementary-age students.
 Meadow Ranch is a camp for junior high students
 Ponderosa is a camp for senior high students and is known for recreation including extreme sports like Kajabe Can Can.
Wildwood is a camp for senior high students who are looking for discipleship.

Hume Socal 
Hume Socal is a camp located in San Bernardino County.

Hume New England 
Hume New England is a 500 acre Christian camp in Monterey, Massachusetts. First developed by The Sudan Interior Mission in 1929 a camp was opened on the site in 1941 by New England Keswick.

History 

Hume Lake Christian Camps began as Fellowship Conferences, and was founded by Walter Warkentin and partners in 1945 in Dinuba, California. Walt Warkentin, Dave Hofer, Hermon Pettit and John Strain formed a number of Christian organizations, including Fellowship Conferences, after meeting to pray about their relationship with God. Walter Warkentin was named director of Fellowship Conferences when the group drew assignments written on slips of paper that had been placed in a bible.

On January 9, 1946, 320 acres of land was purchased for the camp adjacent to Hume Lake at a cost of $140,000 and included the Hume Lake Hotel, store, service station, post office, 22 cottages and 22 boats. After the purchase, land was cleared for buildings and roads. Trees were selectively cut that posed safety risks yielding 2 million board feet of lumber. Don French managed a small sawmill that was built to handle the lumber. Many of the facilities were re-purposed from the mill town built by the property's original owners the Hume-Bennett Lumber Company.

In 1946, during the inaugural summer, 15 volunteer staff hosted 670 campers.

In 1963 Hume was expected to host 9,000 and by the end of 1966, 10,511 people would visit Hume.

In 1966 from December 2 to the 6th, a severe storm caused an estimated $19,000 in damages, destroying buildings, bridges and the waterfront.

In 1991 a dispute with the US Forest Service over the border of Hume was resolved. In 1978 It was discovered that part of the camp including the main office was built on Forest Service Land. After 13 years a land trade and boundary agreement was arranged that allowed the continued use of the land.

In 2011 Hume bought Hume New England in Monterey, Massachusetts.

In 2015 the Rough Fire threatened the camp and on September 2, 2015 over 2,500 people were safely evacuated from the camp and surrounding area. All camp events were cancelled and only security personnel remained.

References

External links 
 
 

Christian orders
Summer camps in California
Summer camps in the United States
Christian summer camps
Christian organizations based in the United States